BGS may stand for:

Art and entertainment
Bee Gees, a rock and disco group
Beautiful Game Studios, a computer game developer
Bethesda Game Studios, a video game developer
Brasil Game Show, yearly Brazilian video game convention
Bunny Girl Senpai, Japanese light novel series

Science and technology
Below ground surface, in scientific reports; see Australian Aboriginal prehistoric sites
Baller–Gerold syndrome
Berkeley gas-filled separator, an instrument that uses a magnetic deflection system filled with gas at low pressure; see Isotopes of flerovium
Braunstein-Ghosh-Severini Entropy, of a network
British Geological Survey, an organisation in the United Kingdom
British Geriatrics Society, the professional body of specialists involved with health care of the elderly in the United Kingdom

Schools
Bandon Grammar School, an independent, fee-paying school in Bandon, County Cork
Bangor Grammar School, a voluntary school in Bangor, County Down
Bankstown Grammar School, in Australia
Beverley Grammar School, a state grammar school in Beverley, England
Bexley Grammar School, a co-educational grammar school in Bexley, England
Boston Grammar School, in Boston, England
Bourne Grammar School, in Bourne, England
Bradford Grammar School, an independent grammar school in Bradford, England
Brisbane Grammar School, one of the oldest high schools in Queensland, Australia
Brighton Grammar School, in Melbourne, Australia
Bristol Grammar School, an independent grammar school in Bristol, England
Burnham Grammar School, a co-educational grammar school in Burnham, Buckinghamshire
Bury Grammar School, an independent grammar school in Greater Manchester, England

Transport
Begusarai railway station, Bihar, India, Indian Railways station code
Bugis MRT station, Singapore, MRT station abbreviation

Other uses
Bachelor of General Studies, an undergraduate degree, similar to a Bachelor of Arts
 BackGround Sound, such as in video games and anime
Beta Gamma Sigma, a business honor society
Bouquet, Garcin & Schivre, a French electric car manufactured between 1899 and 1906
Brigadier General Staff, the chief staff officer in a British army Corps
Bundesgrenzschutz, the German Federal Border Guard, now called the German Federal Police